The Bandodkar Gold Trophy, was an annual Indian football tournament held in Goa and organized by Goa Football Association. The tournament was first started in 1970 and to showcase the Goans' capabilities to organise an All-India football tournament. This was the first major cup tournament hosted by GFA, which was aided by the then Chief Minister Dayanand Bandodkar, who being a sports aficionado donated the trophy. This enabled the GFA to showcase its organisational skills. Apart from some top clubs from Goa, clubs from other Indian states, also have participated in this competition. Dempo SC has won the tournament for a record eight times, while Salgaocar FC won the last major edition held in 1992.

In 2016, the historic tournament was revived as an invitational u-21 Men's football tournament and was held at Duler Stadium in Goa. The edition was won by FC Pune City (R) defeating the local side Dempo SC.

Results

References 

Football in Goa
Football cup competitions in India
1970 establishments in India
2016 disestablishments in India
Recurring sporting events established in 1970
Defunct football competitions in India